Chryse was a town on the Hellespont, mentioned by Stephanus of Byzantium as being between Abydus and Ophrynium, which would put it on the Asian side, in ancient Mysia.

The site of Chryse is unlocated.

References

Populated places in ancient Mysia
Former populated places in Turkey
Lost ancient cities and towns